The 2016 Arctic Winter Games, officially known with the slogan "Join — Feel — Jump", was a winter multi-sport event which took place in Nuuk, Greenland, between  6–12 March 2016. The elected host city was announced on 14 September 2012 by the Arctic Winter Games International Committee (AWGIC) in Whitehorse, Yukon, Canada.

The Arctic Winter Games is the world's largest multisport and cultural event for young people of the Arctic. The Games is an international biennial celebration of circumpolar sports and culture held for a week, each time with a different nation or region as the host. AWG celebrates sports, social interaction and culture. The Games contributes to creating an awareness on cultural diversity, and develops athletes to participate in the competitions with the focus on fair play. The Games binds the Arctic countries together and includes traditional games such as Arctic sports and Dené games.

Around 1,200 athletes from nine teams participated in the games. Around 4,000 people were involved in 2016 Arctic Winter Games, including all competitors and participants in sports and cultural events.

Organization
The Government of Greenland, the Municipality of Sermersooq and the business community of Greenland are the owners and the hosts of the AWG2016. Led by a General Manager, the day-to-day operations and the practical work are handled by the AWG2016 Secretariat.

In September 2013, Maliina Abelsen was appointed as head of the Nuuk 2016 Organizing Committee.

Marketing
The 2016 Arctic Winter Games' mascot was a Seal named "Kuluk". Out of 228 different suggestions for the naming of the mascot competition, the name "Kuluk" won and was appointed by the steering committee.

Participants
Nine contingents participated in the 2016 Arctic Winter Games. The amount of athletes sent by each contingent is shown in parenthesis in the list below.
 Alaska, United States (241)
 Greenland (120) (host)
 Northern Alberta, Canada (191)
 Northwest Territories, Canada (218)
 Nunavik, Quebec, Canada (57)
 Nunavut, Canada (142)
 Sámi people (31)
 Yamalo-Nenets, Russia (4)
 Yukon, Canada (234)

Venues

The 2016 games were held at various sports venues and schools in and around Nuuk, the exception being the ice hockey events, which were held in Iqaluit, Canada. Opening and closing ceremonies were held at Inussivik.

Sports venues
The following venues hosted sports events during the games. Unless otherwise mentioned, the venues are located in Nuuk.

Cultural venues

The following venues hosted cultural events during the games.

Medal tally

The Games

Sports
213 events in 15 sport disciplines were held at 2016 Arctic Winter Games program. Four skiing sports were held, with alpine skiing, biathlon, cross-country skiing, and snowboarding. Two snowshoe events were held, with snowshoe biathlon and snowshoeing. Two racquet sports were held, with badminton and table tennis. Team sports held were basketball, futsal, ice hockey, and volleyball. Traditional Inuit sports were also held, with Arctic sports, Dene games, and wrestling, the latter also including events for traditional wrestling.

The 2016 Arctic Winter Games was the first edition of the games to have futsal on the program. From 1980 to 2014 the sports program had included indoor soccer, but it was replaced by futsal in the 2016 games.

The 2016 games were the first edition of the Arctic Winter Games to not include curling and the first since 1990 to not include dog mushing. Gymnastics, figure skating and speed skating were also removed from the program. For all excluded sports the reasoning for their removal from the programme were a lack of facilities.

Calendar

Culture 
The Arctic Winter Games celebrates culture and creates in the participants an awareness of cultural similarities and dissimilarities. Cultural exchange and social interaction are important parts of the Games. Each participating contingent contributes with performances in dance, song, music, plays or art. These cultural events reflect the traditional as well as the modern cultures of the Arctic. Workshops on a number of cultural, artistic and sports areas were open throughout the Arctic Winter Games.

Hodgson Trophy
At each Arctic Winter Games, the AWG International Committee presents the Hodgson Trophy to the contingent whose athletes best exemplify the ideals of fair play and team spirit. Team members also receive a distinctive pin in recognition of their accomplishment. The Alaskan team and delegation won the Hodgson Trophy at the 2016 Arctic Winter Games.

References

External links

2016 Arctic Winter Games Official Site
Arctic Winter Games Official Site

 
 

Arctic Winter Games, 2016
 Greenland
Arct
2016
Sport in Nuuk
Multi-sport events in Greenland
Events in Greenland
International sports competitions hosted by Greenland
March 2016 sports events in North America